Gravity-assisted microdissection (GAM) is one of the laser microdissection methods. The dissected material is allowed to fall by gravity into a cap and may thereafter be used for isolating proteins or genetic material. Two manufacturers in the world have developed their own device based on GAM method.

Microdissection procedure

In the case of ION LMD system, after preparing sample and staining, transfer tissue on window slide. The slide is mounted inversely. Motorized stage moves to pre-selected drawing line and laser beam cuts the cells of interests by laser ablation. Selected cells are collected in the tube cap which is under the slide via gravity.

Application

Dissected materials such as single cells or cell populations of interests are used for these further researches.

Molecular pathology
Cell biology
Genomics
Cancer research
Pharmaceutical research
Veterinary medicine
Forensic analysis
Reproductive medicine

References

Biological techniques and tools